Joseph-Rémi Vallières de Saint-Réal (October 1, 1787 – February 17, 1847) was a lawyer, judge and political figure in Lower Canada.

He was born Joseph-Rémi Vallières in Carleton in 1787, the son of a blacksmith, and moved to Windham Township in Upper Canada with his family in 1799. After the death of his father, he moved to Quebec City, where he was tutored by Monsignor Joseph-Octave Plessis, and then studied at the Petit Séminaire de Québec. He studied law with Charles Thomas and then with Edward Bowen and qualified to practice in 1812. He served as a lieutenant in the militia during the War of 1812. He married Louise, the daughter of seigneur Pierre-Melchior Pezard de Champlain in 1812. He acquired property at Quebec, was the main shareholder in a toll bridge over the Etchemin River, was a part-owner in a lumber business and owned a gristmill that he rented out in exchange for a large portion of its flour production. He was elected to the Legislative Assembly of Lower Canada for Saint-Maurice in 1814, then represented the Upper Town of Quebec from 1820 to 1829. Vallières de Saint-Réal was a moderate member of the parti canadien. He opposed the union of Upper and Lower Canada proposed in 1822 and served as speaker from 1823 to 1825 during the absence of Louis-Joseph Papineau, who went to London to present the case against the union. He helped found the Literary and Historical Society of Quebec in 1824 and served as a vice-president.

In 1829, he was named provincial judge at Trois-Rivières after the death of Pierre-Stanislas Bédard. He was named resident judge in the Court of King's Bench for Trois-Rivières district in 1830. In 1836, he married Jane Keirnan, a widow, there; his first wife had died in 1829. Vallières de Saint-Réal was named to the Executive Council in 1838. He was suspended as a judge later that year because he issued a writ of habeas corpus shortly after habeas corpus had been suspended by colonial administrator Sir John Colborne. He signed a petition against the Union of Upper and Lower Canada in 1840. He was reinstated as a judge in August of that year and compensated for his loss of income during the suspension. In 1842, he was named chief justice in the Court of King's Bench for Montreal district.

He died at Montreal in 1847.

References
 

1787 births
1847 deaths
Members of the Legislative Assembly of Lower Canada
Lower Canada judges
Province of Canada judges